The Save-Ums! is a Canadian CGI animated children's television series produced by Decode Entertainment. The series premiered on Discovery Kids as part of the Ready Set Learn programming block on February 24, 2003, and ended on July 11, 2006 with 39 episodes being produced.

Synopsis
The Save-Ums, which consist of Jazzi, Noodle, Custard, Ka-Chung, Foo and B.B. Jammies, are patrol group of six aliens of various appearances, who help various critters when they run into difficulty.

Each episode begins with a call on the "adventure screen" (essentially a videophone) from an inhabitant of the world in which the Save-Ums live. The caller describes the difficulty that needs to be resolved, and then select Save-Ums travel to the scene of the problem. There are three different places that the Save-Ums travel to solve problems: Rock World, an island with a huge mountain; Lava World, a tropical island with a volcano; and Wave World, which is under the ocean.

The Save-Ums then assist in solving the problem. Each episode ends with the problem being solved and the Save-Ums returning to their safety headquarters.

Characters

The Save-Ums
 Jazzi (voiced by Tajja Isen) is a female purple passionate girl with red hair tied into two puppytails who dreams to speak the language of wild horses. She is afraid of water and is shown to be the leader in numerous episodes. She is known to say "People, we have a plan!" whenever she, another Save-Um, or a secondary character has an idea.
 Noodle (Caboche in the French dub, voiced by Mark Rendall in season 1 and Cameron Ansell in season 2) is a male white pound puppy-like alien who is the most intelligent and mature of the group, often being the voice of reason and helping others to see what is right. He also pilots the subchopper, a helicopter that travels on air or under the sea.
 Custard (Berlingot in the French dub, voiced by Jordan Francis) is a cool male purple and red cat-eared Save-Um who pilots the Zoomer, a powerboat that travels on either water or snow, and goes on most missions. He is known for saying "Bam!" when he has an idea.
 Ka-Chung (Aïkido in the French dub, voiced by Mitchell Eisner) is a male red and white hippopotamus-like alien who is the toughest Save-Um. He is known to shout "Ka-Chung!" as his catchphrase. He strongs the Ka-Drill, a tunnel boring machine.
 Foo (Louna in the French dub, voiced by Aaryn Doyle) is a female blue and yellow long limbed angelfish-like bird who is the youngest and nicest of the Save-Ums. She also goes on most missions. She flies a jet pack.
 B.B. Jammies (Bébé Jimmy in the French dub, voiced by Connor Price) is Jazzi's miniature brother, who has a purple diamond-shaped head. Since he is too little to go on missions, he mostly plays with the Puffs.

Other recurring
 The Puffs are six tiny fluffy colorful of rainbow pets who live and play with the Save-Ums, but don't go on any missions. They sometimes are a help to them.
 Winston (voiced by Asa Perlman impersonating Woody Allen) is a bespectacled whale who lives in Wave World and has an underwater garden.
 Tony and Sal (voiced by Demore Barnes) are army crabs who live in Wave World.
 Andre (voiced by Amanda Soha) is a little super seahorse who lives in Wave World.
 Olena (voiced by Sugar Lyn Beard) is a little octopus who lives in Wave World.
 Raymundo (Carlos Diaz) and Peque are ants who live in Lava World.
 Oscar (voiced by Benny Shilling and Scott Beaudin (sometimes)) and Tina (voiced by Melanie Tonello) are little monkeys who live in Lava World.
 Baby Dino is a baby dinosaur babysat by Raymundo and Peque, who lives in Lava World.
 Colin and Elizabat (voiced by Rob Smith and Jonathan Wilson in season 1, Dolly Reno and Pheobe McAuely in season 2) are furry bats who live in Rock World. 
 Dory (voiced by Alexandra Lai) and Terrell (voiced by Frank Ferlisi) and Terrell are glowblobs who live in Rock World.

Episodes

Season 1 (2003)
The UK dubbed episodes of season 1 consist of just one story segment and originally broadcast on Channel 5 as part of the Milkshake! block.
 Episode #1 Untangle That Octopus!/Runaway Toy Car! (February 24, 2003)
 Episode #2 Dino Sandwich!/Where Are Winston's Glasses? (February 25, 2003)
 Episode #3 The Mystery of Winston's Garden!/Operation Banana Split! (February 26, 2003)
 Episode #4 Scary Things Don't Blink!/Tina in the Sky! (February 27, 2003)
 Episode #5 Save That Little Tree!/A Rock in Winston's Garden! (February 28, 2003)
 Episode #6 Operation Dino Diaper!/Rescue Wonder Winston! (March 3, 2003)
 Episode #7 Fix That Broken Drum!/Brush That Dino's Tooth! (March 4, 2003)
 Episode #8 Andre's Super Water Bubble!/Catch That Falling Crab! (March 5, 2003)
 Episode #9 Making Little Peque Safe!/Andre's Hole in One! (March 6, 2003)
 Episode #10 Panic Picnic in Wave World!/Oscar Has a Flat! (March 7, 2003)
 Episode #11 The Ghost of Wave World!/Tina's Extra Special Thing! (March 10, 2003)
 Episode #12 Unstick That Ant!/Follow That Mystery Map! (March 11, 2003)
 Episode #13 Wash That Dirty Dino!/Save That Fish! (March 12, 2003)
 Episode #14 Find That Little Grub's Phone!/Bats & Oranges! (March 13, 2003)
 Episode #15 Swing That Baby Dino!/Rescue That Loco Coco! (March 14, 2003)
 Episode #16 Danger: Sticky Food!/Too Many Bananas! (March 17, 2003) St Patrick Day Special In USA
 Episode #17 Lost in Rock World!/The Vanishing! (March 18, 2003)
 Episode #18 Operation Seesaw!/Two Cakes in One! (March 19, 2003)
 Episode #19 Time to Paint A Picture!/Pick Up That Spoon! (March 20, 2003)
 Episode #20 Foo is Powerful!/Stop Winston's Hiccups! (March 21, 2003)
 Episode #21 Fix That Trophy!/A Little Goes A Long Way! (March 24, 2003)
 Episode #22 Pitch That Tent!/Tie That Balloon! (March 25, 2003)
 Episode #23 Monkey Up a Tree!/It's Halloween! (March 26, 2003)
 Episode #24 Entertain Those Grubs!/Keep Those Monkeys Cool! (March 27, 2003)
 Episode #25 Super Cool Birthday Message!/Hide and Seek! (March 28, 2003)
 Episode #26 Save That Ant!/Find That Pet! (March 31, 2003)

Season 2 (2005–2006)
The UK dubbed episodes of season 2 consist of just one segment and originally broadcast on Channel 5 as part of the Milkshake! block.
 Make That Grub Gluey Again!/Save That Sandman! (April 18, 2005)
 Operation Beat Poetry Party!/Hopscotch Emergency! (April 25, 2005)
 Rockabye That Baby Dino!/Splinter Emergency! (May 2, 2005)
 Lava World Race!/Scratch that Whale's Back! (May 9, 2005)
 Make That Whale A Doll!/Operation Rocco Robot! (May 16, 2005)
 Save Those Glasses!/Extra Icky Spider Web! (May 23, 2005)
 Making Winston Go Poof!/Stop That Ice Cream! (May 30, 2005)
 Red Puff's Big Adventure!/Elizabat's Pet Potato! (June 6, 2005)
 Make Those Valentines!/Loco Coco Is Sinking! (June 13, 2005)
 Keep on Dancing!/Spooky Tickle Adventure! (June 20, 2005)
 Smile, Silly Sea Sammies!/Tony And Sal's Treasure Hunt! (June 27, 2005)
 Grab That Crab!/Teddysaurus Rescue! (July 4, 2006)
 Mount Rock World Adventure!/Lift That Weight! (July 11, 2006)

References

External links

 
 ABC's Save-Ums website
 The Save-Ums on Family Jr.
 The Save-Ums on Télémagino 

2000s Canadian animated television series
2000s Canadian children's television series
2003 Canadian television series debuts
2006 Canadian television series endings
Canadian children's animated television series
Canadian preschool education television series
Animated preschool education television series
2000s preschool education television series
CBC Kids original programming
Family Jr. original programming
Television series by DHX Media
Animated television series about animals
Canadian computer-animated television series
Channel 4 original programming

English-language television shows